Ay Khorn is a Cambodian politician. He is a member of the Cambodian People's Party and was elected to represent Koh Kong Province in the National Assembly of Cambodia in the 2003 elections.

References

Members of the National Assembly (Cambodia)
Members of the Senate (Cambodia) 
Cambodian People's Party politicians
Living people
Year of birth missing (living people)
Place of birth missing (living people)